Pierre Campana (born 1 May 1985 in Bastia) is a French rally driver from Corsica.

Career
Campana began rallying in 2004, and made his World Rally Championship debut in 2007 on his home event, the Tour de Corse. Driving a Citroën C2 R2, he retired with a mechanical issue. He returned one year later in a Renault Clio R3, as a wildcard entry in the Junior World Rally Championship class. He finished the rally 21st overall and third in JWRC.

In 2010 Campana contested three rounds of the Intercontinental Rally Challenge in his Renault Clio R3. On the Monte Carlo Rally he was 12th overall and second in 2WD. He repeated that same feat on the Ypres Rally. He retired from Czech Rally Zlín after losing a wheel.

Campana returned to Monte Carlo in 2011 and this time won the 2WD category, finishing 14th overall. He then entered his home event the Tour de Corse in a Peugeot 207 S2000, finishing fourth overall. Campana will make his World Rally Car debut on Rallye Deutschland in a Mini John Cooper Works WRC entered by the Fédération Française du Sport Automobile, whose 'Rally Team France' programme Campana will now lead.

2012
In 2012 Campana will race the second chassis for Mini WRC Team.

WRC results

References

External links
Official website

Living people
1985 births
Sportspeople from Bastia
French rally drivers
World Rally Championship drivers
Intercontinental Rally Challenge drivers